Highway M11 is a Ukraine international highway (M-highway) connecting Lviv with Przemyśl across the Polish - Ukrainian border, where it continues into Poland as National Road 28 (DK 28).

The route serves as an alternative to the M10.

Route

See also

 International E-road network
 Pan-European corridors

References

External links
 International Roads in Ukraine in Russian
 European Roads in Russian

Roads in Lviv Oblast